Wathelet is a surname. Notable people with the surname include:

 (1922-2003), Belgian political activist
Melchior Wathelet (born 1949), Belgian politician
Melchior Wathelet, Jr. (born 1977), Belgian politician
Grégory Wathelet (born 1980), Belgian show jumper

Surnames of Belgian origin
French-language surnames